Mary Mulligan (born 12 February 1960, Liverpool) is a Scottish Labour Party politician, and formerly Member of the Scottish Parliament (MSP) for Linlithgow constituency from 1999 to 2011. She lost her seat to the Scottish National Party's Fiona Hyslop in the 2011 Scottish Parliament election.

She was appointed Deputy Minister for Health and Community Care upon Jack McConnell becoming First Minister in 2001. After the reshuffle following the 2003 election she became Deputy Minister for Communities. She resigned from this position in October 2004 in order to concentrate on preventing St John's Hospital in Livingston being downgraded. This hospital served many of her constituents. Nevertheless, services were cut from the hospital as planned.

Mulligan was Labour's Shadow Minister for Housing and Communities. She was a member of the Scottish Parliament Local Government and Communities Committee.

References

External links 
 
Mary Mulligan MSP Official Website
Mary Mulligan profile at the site of Scottish Labour

1960 births
Living people
Politicians from Liverpool
Labour MSPs
Members of the Scottish Parliament 1999–2003
Members of the Scottish Parliament 2003–2007
Members of the Scottish Parliament 2007–2011
Ministers of the Scottish Government
Women members of the Scottish Government
20th-century Scottish women politicians